The 1997 PBA All-Filipino Cup Finals was the best-of-7 basketball championship series of the 1997 PBA All-Filipino Cup, and the conclusion of the conference's playoffs. The Gordon's Gin Boars and Purefoods Corned Beef Cowboys played for the 66th championship contested by the league.

The Purefoods Corned Beef Cowboys won their 5th PBA championship with a 4–2 series win over the Gordon's Gin Boars.

Alvin Patrimonio won on his first Finals MVP in All-Filipino Cup Finals.

Qualification

Series scoring summary

Games summary

Game 1

The Cowboys took a whooping 47–28 lead at halftime with Bong Ravena scorching hot. The Boars trimmed down the deficit from as high as 22 in the first few minutes of the third quarter to just six points, 75–81, halfway through the fourth period. Gordon's had a mediocre 33% field goal in the first two quarters and committed 14 turnovers.

Game 2

Game 3

Game 4

Gordon's embarked on a hot start with Pido Jarencio shutting the lights out with his near-flawless shooting from beyond the arc that gave the Boars a 10-point lead, 44–34, in the first 24 minutes of play.

The Cowboys' mental toughness took over in the second half and a mini-rally saw them trailed by only one point, 67–68, after three quarters. The Boars had the opportunity to level the series but a collapse in the fourth period allowed the Cowboys to respond with chilling efficiency.

Game 5

Vince Hizon came through with a huge defensive play in the closing seconds to preserved a Boars' victory.

Game 6

Going into the last quarter, the Cowboys trailed, 56–57. An 8–0 run from the start of the fourth period gave them a seven-point edge, 64–57. After Jayvee Gayoso hit a triple, a 7–1 blast by the Cowboys with Bong Ravena hitting his own three-pointer put Purefoods in front by 10 points, 71–61. Five straight points by the Boars close the gap to within, 66–71, nearing the final two minutes. Alvin Patrimonio's long jumper clinch the title for the Cowboys with a nine-point lead, 78–69. Patrimonio played for 45 minutes and scored 40 of his team's 82-point production, grabbed 11 rebounds and issued four assists. Alvin Patrimonio won on his first Finals MVP and Purefoods captures win on his fifth championship title.

Rosters

Broadcast notes

References

External links
PBA official website

1997 PBA season
1997
Magnolia Hotshots games
Barangay Ginebra San Miguel games
Manila Clasico
PBA All-Filipino Cup Finals